Wurmbea australis is a species of plant in the Colchicaceae family that is endemic to South Australia.

References

australis
Monocots of Australia
Flora of South Australia
Plants described in 1995
Taxa named by Robert John Bates